Rafia Parveen  (born 13 November 1992) is a Pakistani footballer who plays as a defender for the Pakistan women's national football team.

References

1992 births
Living people
Pakistani women's footballers
Place of birth missing (living people)
Women's association football defenders
Pakistan women's international footballers